is a Japanese magazine published by ASCII Media Works (formerly MediaWorks) and sold monthly on the thirtieth that primarily contains information on bishōjo games, but also includes an entire section on anime based on bishōjo games, and serializes manga and light novels based on such games. The "G's" in the title stands for "Gals" and "Games". The magazine is known for hosting reader participation games whose outcome is directly influenced by the people who read the magazine; such games include Sister Princess, and Strawberry Panic!. Dengeki G's Magazine first went on sale on 26 December 1992 with the February 1993 issue under the title Dengeki PC Engine, which changed to the current title in 2002. A special edition spin-off version called Dengeki G's Festival! is published in irregular intervals and each issue focuses on a specific bishōjo game. Four other special edition versions under the Festival! name are Dengeki G's Festival! Comic, Dengeki G's Festival! Deluxe, Dengeki G's Festival! Anime, and Dengeki Festival! Heaven. Dengeki G's Magazine'''s sister magazine is Dengeki Girl's Style, which publishes information on otome games, targeted towards females.

Despite the self-describing "magazine" description, the publication has over 350 pages an issue. About half of the magazine pages are colored and contain information about games or anime; the remaining pages, placed at the end of the magazine, are serialized manga series. Unlike typical Japanese publications, pages are turned from right to left for the first half of the magazine, but this is switched to the traditional left to right configuration when reading the manga series. Dengeki G's Magazine celebrated its fifteenth year of publication in 2007 and its 200th release with the October 2007 issue.

History

Dengeki PC Engine
Due to an internal struggle in Kadokawa Shoten near the end of 1992, a group of people split off to create the company MediaWorks on October 15, 1992. The overall title PC Engine came from the Japanese name for the TurboGrafx-16 video game console first released by NEC in 1987, and the magazine was originally intended to be an information source for the console. However, after NEC Avenue produced a popular dating sim called Sotsugyō: Graduation — which drama CDs, light novels, original video animations, and manga were adapted from — MediaWorks changed the layout of Dengeki PC Engine to have more coverage on adaptations of games the magazine reported on.

A reader-participation game called Megami Stadium had run in Marukatsu PC Engine between the May 1992 and January 1993 issues, so starting with the February 1993 issue of Dengeki PC Engine, MediaWorks created a revival of the game called Megami Paradise which ran in even-numbered issues up until the June 1996 issue. About a year after MediaWorks started Megami Paradise, Marukatsu PC Engine ceased publication on January 30, 1994. That same year in December, the first special edition version of Dengeki PC Engine called Dengeki PlayStation was published. The following year, Dengeki PlayStation broke off to become its own magazine. This was in response to the release of Sony's PlayStation video game console in December 1994.

Dengeki G's Engine to present

Instead, the magazine would now contain information on all bishōjo games as the "G's" in the title stands for both "Gals" and "Games". The spelling of the title was slightly altered a final time with the May 2002 issue on March 30, 2002 to be .

After running a string of reader-participation games between 1993 and 1998, Dengeki G's Magazine started Sister Princess in March 1999; this would prove to make the magazine very popular, and became a major focus of the magazine for several years. Nearly all the magazine's covers between 1999 and 2003 featured characters from Sister Princess. After overwhelming support for the project, the series was adapted into a two-series anime, and a string of video games; finally, the serialization of the game ending with the September 2003 issue. At the time, the second TV anime adaptation of another of Dengeki G's Magazine's reader-participation games, Happy Lesson, was just ending, but the series had proved popular. Seeing how popular their reader-participation games could get, MediaWorks continued to create reader-participation games, something the magazine is well known for today. After Sister Princess ended, the editorial department looked to another reader-participation game which started in the October 2002 issue called Futakoi, and the editors wanted to make this game Dengeki G's Magazines next main focus; the game lasted until October 2005.

On September 30, 2005, with the November 2005 issue, another magazine published by MediaWorks entitled Dengeki AniMaga was merged with Dengeki G's Magazine. This caused a massive influx of anime information, and manga and light novels to be serialized in Dengeki G's Magazine. Following this, G's Magazine started including more information on adult games starting with the November 2005 issue. Between the March 1999 and October 2005 issues, the cover of G's Magazine depicted a girl from one of the reader-participation games running at the time. This was changed from November 2005 onwards where now the cover would depict a heroine from a bishōjo game, which were generally adult games. Between the November 2005 and April 2006 issues, the cover of G's Magazine contained girls from To Heart 2 XRATED and FullAni, two games released by Leaf at the time. This style was similarly adopted for the issues between May 2006 and October 2006 with girls from Da Capo II, and again between for the issues between November 2006 and March 2007 with girls from Yoake Mae yori Ruriiro na. This style of deciding on the cover art was dropped with the April 2007 issue. With the October 2007 issue, Dengeki G's Magazine celebrated its 200th consecutive release. Following the release of the May 2014 issue, most of the manga serialized in the magazine were transferred to Dengeki G's Comic.

Features
Series
Manga

Light novels

Reader participation gamesDengeki G's Magazine often hosts reader participation games whose outcome is directly influenced by the people who read the magazine. The length of these games vary; some can go on for years, while others end in less than a year. How long a game lasts is decided on how popular the game is among the readers and how many readers participate. At least one game has been running in the magazine since the first issue except during the time between the December 1998 and February 1999 issues when Ojōsama Express ended and Sister Princess began, and again with the November 2005 issue between when Futakoi ended and 2/3 Ai no Kyōkaisen began. Love Live! is the longest-running game, running since July 2010.

Special editionsDengeki PlayStationDengeki PlayStation originally began as a special edition of Dengeki G's Magazine and was first published in December 1994. After this issue was released, it was decided that Dengeki PlayStation would become its own magazine.Dengeki G's ParadiseDengeki G's Paradise was another special edition issue originally published in 1997. Only one issue was published, and its main feature was the dating sim Sentimental Graffiti.Dengeki G's Festival!Dengeki G's Festival! is the third special edition version of Dengeki G's Magazine. The first volume was published in December 2004, and since then, 17 volumes have been published, the latest of which was in July 2010. Dengeki G's Festival is published in irregular intervals that range anywhere between less than a week, to more than six months. The magazine has had a similar style of formatting from the third volume on, and contains about 80 pages an issue on a specific bishōjo game (other than volume two which covered two games). In addition to the main magazine, each issue comes bundled with bonus material depicting characters from the series that is the current feature of a given issue. One of the recurring items is a hug pillowcase featuring an image of one or more bishōjo characters in a sexually suggestive pose.Dengeki G's Festival! ComicDengeki G's Festival! Comic is the second magazine under the Dengeki G's Festival! line. The first volume was published on November 26, 2007 and each volume has about five-hundred pages. The magazine contains manga based on bishōjo games; many of the manga that appear in the magazine were first serialized in Dengeki G's Magazine. In addition to the main magazine, each issue comes bundled with bonus material depicting characters from the manga currently being serialized.Dengeki G's Festival! DeluxeDengeki G's Festival! Deluxe is the third magazine under the Dengeki G's Festival! line. The first volume was published on November 30, 2007 and each volume has about eighty pages. In contrast to Dengeki G's Festival! which only covers the visual novel aspect of a given bishōjo game, Deluxe offers information on adaptations in addition to information on the original game. As with the previous two Festival! magazines, each issue of Deluxe comes bundled with bonus material depicting characters from the series that is the current feature of a given issue.Dengeki G's Festival! AnimeDengeki G's Festival! Anime is the fourth magazine under the Dengeki G's Festival! line. The first volume was published on February 9, 2008. Each issue has a large focus on a single anime series, though there is information on other series adapted from manga or light novels originally published by ASCII Media Works. As with the previous three Festival! magazines, each issue of Anime comes bundled with bonus material depicting characters from the series that is the current feature of a given issue.Dengeki Festival! HeavenDengeki Festival! Heaven is another special edition version of Dengeki G's Magazine. The first volume was published on July 9, 2008. The magazine contains manga based on otome games and is targeted towards females. In addition to the main magazine, each issue comes bundled with bonus material depicting characters from the manga currently being serialized.

Notes and references

 These manga were transferred to Dengeki G's Comic''.

External links
  

 
1992 establishments in Japan
Monthly manga magazines published in Japan
Video game magazines published in Japan
Magazines established in 1992
Magazines published in Tokyo